Borgo is a commune in the Haute-Corse department of France on the island of Corsica.

The Bastia-Poretta Airport is located in Borgo. It was the site of the 1768 Battle of Borgo during the French Conquest of Corsica when a French force was defeated by Corsican troops.

Population

Sights
Torra di Punta d'Arcu

See also
Communes of the Haute-Corse department

References

Communes of Haute-Corse
Haute-Corse communes articles needing translation from French Wikipedia